Kentucky is a 1938 American drama sports film with Loretta Young, Richard Greene, and Walter Brennan. It was directed by David Butler. It is a Romeo and Juliet story of lovers Jack and Sally, set amidst Kentucky horseracing, in which a family feud goes back to the Civil War and is kept alive by Sally's Uncle Peter.

Plot
During the Civil War, Thad Goodwin Sr. (Charles Waldron) of Elmtree Farm, a local horse breeder, resists Capt. John Dillon (Douglass Dumbrille) and a company of Union soldiers confiscating his prize horses. He is killed by Dillon and his youngest son Peter (Bobs Watson) cries at the soldiers riding away with the horses.

75 years later, in 1938, Peter (Walter Brennan), now a crotchety old man, still resides on Elmtree Farm and raises horses with his niece Sally (Loretta Young). Dillon's grandson Jack (Richard Greene) and Sally meet, her not knowing that he was a Dillon. Sally's father, Thad Goodwin Jr., dies when his speculation on cotton drops. The Goodwins are forced to auction off nearly all their horses and Jack offers his services to Sally, as a trainer of their last prize horse, "Bessie's Boy", who is later injured.

Sally eventually loses the farm, and Mr. Dillon makes good on his original bet with Thad Jr. and offers her any two-year-old on his farm. At her uncle's insistence, she reluctantly selects "Blue Grass" instead of the favorite, "Postman", and Jack trains him for the Derby. She eventually learns of Jack's real identity and fires him as a trainer. During the race, Blue Grass runs neck and neck with the Dillon's horse Postman, but Blue Grass wins thanks to Jack's advice. Sally embraces Jack, but Peter collapses before the decoration ceremony and dies. At his funeral, Dillon eulogizes him and of the American life of the past, as "The Grand Old Man of the American Turf".

Cast
Loretta Young as Sally Goodwin
Richard Greene as Jack Dillon
Walter Brennan as Peter Goodwin
Douglass Dumbrille as John Dillon – 1861
Karen Morley as Mrs. Goodwin – 1861
Moroni Olsen as John Dillon – 1938
Russell Hicks as Thad Goodwin Sr. – 1861
Willard Robertson as Bob Slocum
Charles Waldron as Thad Goodwin – 1938
George Reed as Ben
Bobs Watson as Peter Goodwin – 1861
Delmar Watson as Thad Goodwin Jr. – 1861
Leona Roberts as Grace Goodwin
Charles Lane as Auctioneer
Charles Middleton as Southerner
Harry Hayden as Racing Secretary 
Robert Middlemass as Track Official 
Madame Sul-Te-Wan as Lily 
Cliff Clark as Melish 
Meredith Howard as Susie May 
Charles Trowbridge as Doctor 
Eddie 'Rochester' Anderson as Groom 
Stanley Andrews as Presiding Judge
Blue Washington as	Bill 
Howard Hickman as Banker (uncredited) 
Larry Steers as Thaddeus' Friend (uncredited)
Lillian Yarbo as Magnolia (uncredited)

Notes
Walter Brennan won his second Oscar (Best Supporting Actor) in his role as Peter Goodwin.

References

External links
 
 
 
 

1938 films
Films featuring a Best Supporting Actor Academy Award-winning performance
1938 drama films
1930s sports drama films
1930s color films
American horse racing films
Films about gambling
Films set in Kentucky
Films directed by David Butler
Films shot in Kentucky
Films with screenplays by Lamar Trotti
Films scored by Louis Silvers
Films based on Romeo and Juliet
20th Century Fox films
American sports drama films
1930s American films